Raúl Alfredo Magaña Monzón (24 February 1940 – 30 September 2009) was a Salvadoran footballer and manager.

He is regarded as one of the greats of Salvadoran football.

Club career
Magaña made his debut aged 18 against Deportivo Saprissa in Costa Rica, coming on as a sub for Humberto Pérez. He played for several Salvadoran top level sides, most prominently for hometown club FAS, and also had spells in Guatemala and Canada. He finished his career with Alianza in January 1975.

During his stay at USAC, he earned himself an economy degree.

International career
Nicknamed Araña (spider) and even El Gran Salvadoreño (the great Salvadoran), Magaña represented his country at their first ever World Cup, the 1970 FIFA World Cup in Mexico, the final match against the Soviet Union also being his final international. Like his idol, the legendary Lev Yashin, Magaña also dressed in black and wore caps.

Managerial career
He managed the national side in four different periods, making his debut against Guatemala in 1976. One of his last tricks was to lead Atlético Marte back in the Premier Division after years in the doldrums.

Also, he was president of the CONCACAF Technical Commission for more than eight years.

Death
Magaña died of gastric cancer on 30 September 2009, aged 69. He was survived by his 5 children.

Honours
Primera División de Fútbol de El Salvador: 6
 1957/58, 1961/62, 1962, 1965/66, 1968/69, 1970

 Liga Nacional de Guatemala:
 1963-1964

References

External links
 

1940 births
2009 deaths
Sportspeople from Santa Ana, El Salvador
Association football goalkeepers
Salvadoran footballers
El Salvador international footballers
1970 FIFA World Cup players
C.D. FAS footballers
Alianza F.C. footballers
C.S.D. Municipal players
Toronto Falcons (1967–68) players
North American Soccer League (1968–1984) players
Canadian National Soccer League players
C.D. Atlético Marte footballers
Once Municipal footballers
Expatriate footballers in Guatemala
Expatriate soccer players in Canada
Salvadoran expatriate footballers
Salvadoran expatriate sportspeople in Guatemala
Salvadoran expatriate sportspeople in Canada
Salvadoran football managers
El Salvador national football team managers
C.D. Luis Ángel Firpo managers
Deaths from cancer in El Salvador
Deaths from stomach cancer